The Hendrik Chabot Award (Dutch: Hendrik Chabot Prijs) is an annual award for visual artists presented by the Prins Bernhard Cultuurfonds, section South Holland. The prize ceremony is in the city hall of Rotterdam, where the prize is given by The Mayor of Rotterdam and the King's Commissioner in the province. The reward is named after the Rotterdam artist Hendrik Chabot (1894 – 1949).

Award winners, a selection 
 Kees Timmer (1903-1978), 1966
 Piet van Stuivenberg, 1967
 Wout van Heusden, 1968
 Mathieu Ficheroux, 1969
 Jan van Munster, 1971
 Ton van Os, 1974
 Hans Verweij, 1978
 Daan van Golden and Paul Beckman, 1987 
 Ian Jacob Pieters, 1988
 Axel en Helena van der Kraan, 1989
 Charly van Rest, 1991
 Ine Lamers, 1995
 Joep van Lieshout, 1997
 Co Westerik, 1999
 Jeanne van Heeswijk, 2002
 Dré Wapenaar, 2005
 Wendelien van Oldenborgh, 2011
 Bik Van Der Pol, 2014

See also

 List of European art awards

References 

Dutch art awards